The Arboretum des Milelli is an arboretum located on the 12-hectare grounds of Les Milelli, outside Ajaccio, Corse-du-Sud, Corsica, France. Built c.1581, Les Milelli was the long-time summer retreat of the ancestors of Napoleon I of France, and one of his childhood residences; its olive groves provided a large part of the family's income. Upon his return from Egypt in October 1799, it was where Napoleon spent his last night in Corsica after a stay of two days in the company of his staff, Lannes, Berthier and Murat. The house itself is closed to visitors, but its grounds and arboretum are open. The arboretum, established in 1993, contains woody plants representative of Mediterranean flora; an admission fee is charged. The name I milelli  means " the little apple trees " in Corsican language.

See also 
 Casa Buonaparte - the family home in Ajaccio that is now a museum
 List of botanical gardens in France

References 
 Napoleon.org description
 Urbanis.fr description (French)
 Bois Foret Info description (French)
 Je Decouvre La France description (French)

Buildings and structures completed in 1581
Milelli, Arboretum des
Ajaccio
Milelli, Arboretum des
Napoleon